Rex Crawford (25 February 1932 – 20 July 2022) was a Canadian politician who was a member of the House of Commons from 1988 to 1997. By career, he was a farmer.

Born in Detroit, Michigan, he first campaigned for a seat in Canadian Parliament during the 1988 federal election, as a candidate for the Liberal Party at the Kent electoral district. He won that election and was re-elected there in the 1993 federal election, therefore serving in the 34th and 35th Canadian Parliaments. He left Canadian politics in 1997 since he did not seek a third term in Parliament.

During his federal political career, Crawford would sometimes take views at variance with his fellow Liberals. In 2004, several years after he left Parliament, he supported Conservative party candidate Dave Van Kesteren in the Chatham-Kent—Essex riding during the 2004 federal election.

Crawford died on 20 July 2022, at the age of 90.

Electoral record

References

External links
 

1932 births
2022 deaths
Liberal Party of Canada MPs
Members of the House of Commons of Canada from Ontario
Politicians from Detroit
Farmers from Ontario
American emigrants to Canada